Gelder or Goldar may refer to:
 Gelder, East Azerbaijan
 Gildir, East Azerbaijan
 Goldar, Qazvin